A Pasha Centre is a Digital villages Project (DVP) whose key functions are to provide a suite of services to the public via computers connected to the internet. The Pasha Centres are run by private entrepreneurs who have gone through the training program initiated by Kenya ICT Board. Prospective entrepreneurs who have undergone training are eligible to apply for a Pasha development loan from a revolving fund set up by the Kenya ICT Board.

Pasha is a Swahili word meaning "to inform". The Pasha Project's key role is to provide Kenyans in rural areas with access to information across the country.

Introduction
Most of the ICT facilities in Kenya have been in urban areas, this has resulted in glaring disparities between urban and rural areas in the distribution of ICT facilities. To redress the disparities, the Kenya ICT Board has embarked on a Digital Villages project (DVP) under the Kenya Transparency Communications Infrastructure Project, which will see a creation of networks of information facilities across the country. Digital villages are centres that provide a suite of services to the public via computers connected to the internet, digital cameras, printers, fax machines and other communication infrastructure. The digital village project (DVP) is an integral part of an innovative public-private partnership (PPP) for taking ICTs to the rural communities in Kenya. DVP seeks to harness the vast untapped potential of the rural sector by making ICTs more accessible and affordable to the wider population through the development and utilisation of ICT facilities in the rural areas.

The services to be provided by the Digital Villages will include government services; community-based services as well as a host of commercial services. Pasha is designed and facilitated by the Kenya ICT board in conjunction with key non-commercial partners.

Eligibility criteria
Eligible criteria to be a Pasha centre broadly will be:
 The centre should be an existing community centre
 Should be providing services to the community currently, this service need not necessarily be in ICT related service.
 The vision or strategies of the centre should have synergy to the overall Pasha Project and Kenya ICT Board objectives and Vision.
 Should have interest in becoming a Pasha Centre
 Willingness to be a research centre for the Pasha project

Selection criteria
The Pasha centres are run by private entrepreneurs who obtain training in business and information technology from a certified training program. The training programs are run by the Kenya ICT Board. The provision of training programs in business and information technology from the certified programs will be supported by the DVP project. Prospective entrepreneurs who have obtained certification will be eligible to apply for a Pasha Development loan from a revolving fund set up by the Board.

Role of Pasha Centres
The Pasha Centres are designed to model a community-focused format that will be self-sufficient by using technology in the form of a Web 2.0 collaborative online platform for the Digital Village Pasha Program, led by the board.

The role of the Pasha Centre is to provide Kenyans in rural areas with access to a world of information in a community-focused format that is self-sufficient: This will serve:
 To enhance both their business skills and knowledge as well as expose them to world news and trends that may positively enhance their lives.
 Provide employment for Kenyans both directly through economic activity that the centre will generate and secondarily through the opportunities that the information will provide.
 Enhance provision of government services. Kenyans will be able to access government services such as NSSF statements, driving license application forms, police extracts among others, from the Pasha Centre. These services will all be online.

Pasha Centres will ultimately open up cost-effective access to government and private services for remote farmers and entrepreneurs who would otherwise have to travel extensively to achieve this.

About Kenya ICT Board
The Kenya ICT Board was established by HE President Mwai Kibaki, as a state corporation under the State Corporations Act Cap. 446 on 19 February 2007.

The achievement of an information-based society is one of the main priorities of the Government towards the realisation of national development goals and objectives for wealth and employment creation. ICT is one of the fastest growing sectors in the country. Harnessing of ICT will therefore help the Government to realise a number of its key public policy objectives.

The objectives of the Kenya ICT Board include: To develop, launch and sustain a globally compelling brand marketing campaign for Kenya ICT, To develop and promote competitive ICT industries in Kenya, To develop world class Kenyan ICT institutions and To increase ICT access.

Objectives of the Digital Villages Project
The project has 3 main objectives:
 Provide affordable access and use of ICT resources to rural communities in a sustainable way.
 Increase connectivity of the rural areas to other parts of the country.
 Create economic opportunities that will spur rural economic development.

First Pasha Centre
The first such centre was launched in July 2009 in Kangundo, Kenya. This being the first of six such planned launches all across the country by the Kenya ICT Board working in close partnership with Cisco Systems and The Copy Cat Limited. The other five locations are Malindi (Coast Province), South Imenti (Eastern Province), Garissa (North-Eastern Province), Siaya (Nyanza Province) and Mukuru Kiaba (Nairobi Province). Their purpose is to provide a four-month baseline study on community usage and their adaptation of the services offered. Such information is useful in determining the operational models for future Pasha Entrepreneurs and the portfolio of solutions to incorporate for each centre in the nationwide DVP roll-outs.

Pasha models
The pasha project has the following maturity models;

Basic model
 Basic office services
 Internet surfing
 Emailing

Standard model
 All of basic model
 IT basic skills courses
 IT face to face support
 Access to government services

Advanced model
 All of standard model
 Remote technical support
 Wireless access to satellite "places"
 Educational and vocational course training room
 Health advice room

Budgeting
 Entrepreneur Training – $2 million
 Revolving Fund – $4 million
 IT Support – $2 million
 Bandwidth Support – $2 million

External links
 Kenya ICT Board – Home Page
 Advanced Information Management (Dagoretti Digital Village)
 newsroom.cisco.com – Cisco News Brief
 www.itweb.co.za – Kenyan government opens first pilot Pasha Centre in Kangundo
 www.pasha.co.ke – Official Pasha Website

Communications in Kenya